Madron Lake is a  lake situated on the northwestern quadrant (Sections 8 and 9) of Buchanan Township in Berrien County, Michigan, United States. The outlet of Madron Lake drains west into the East Branch of the Galien River. Buchanan Township maintains a public boat launch off Burgoyne Road. Boats may be powered with electric engines only.

The former Wabano Council (now a District in the Southwestern Michigan Council) of Boy Scouts of America operated Camp Madron, located on the shores of Madron Lake, for many years as an overnight summer camp for boys. Camp Madron was closed and sold to private developers in the 1980s.

The "new" Camp Madron – a 49-unit private homeowners' association situated on  – opened in 1989.

It is considered a great location for fishing because it contains "monster" fish.

See also
List of lakes in Michigan

References

External links
Camp Madron

Lakes of Berrien County, Michigan
Lakes of Michigan